Gračanica is a city located in Tuzla Canton of the Federation of Bosnia and Herzegovina, an entity of Bosnia and Herzegovina. It is located in northeastern Bosnia and Herzegovina, east of Doboj and west of Tuzla. As of 2013, it has a population of 45,220 inhabitants.

Gračanica
Gračanica is located in the lower valley of the River Sokoluša along the main road from Tuzla to Doboj, about 50 km west of Tuzla.

Settlements

History

First writings about Gračanica were found in Turkish archives from 1528, in which Gračanica was known by its iron mine. Gračanica got the status of a town in 1548. It grew bigger during the 17th century, with the help of Ahmed-paša Budimlija, who built the White Mosque, a public bath and a clock tower. Through the time of Austrian Empire, Gračanica experienced huge economic, urban and culture development. From 1929 to 1941, Gračanica was part of the Vrbas Banovina of the Kingdom of Yugoslavia.

Climate

This area is characteristic for small quantity of downfalls, which average year amount is 830mm/m2. Maximum quantity of downfalls is in May (121mm) and June (101mm), and minimum in March (41mm).
Snowfalls are most often at January, February and March (Average: 50 days in a year).
Gračanica is area with continental climate type.

Demographics

Population

Ethnic composition

Notable people
Branko Cvetković, basketball player
Muhamed Konjić, football player
Mitar Lukić, football player
Vedin Musić, football player

Twin towns – sister cities

Gračanica is twinned with:
 Fleury-les-Aubrais, France
 Formia, Italy
 Pljevlja, Montenegro

Sports
 NK Bratstvo Gračanica, an association football club
 RK Gračanica, a handball club

References

 Official results from the book: Ethnic composition of Bosnia-Herzegovina population, by municipalities and settlements, 1991. census, Zavod za statistiku Bosne i Hercegovine - Bilten no.234, Sarajevo 1991.

External links
 Official site
 Gračanica online community site
 Gračanički Glasnik
 Selo Buk, Općina Gračanica

Cities and towns in the Federation of Bosnia and Herzegovina
Populated places in Gračanica
Municipalities of the Tuzla Canton